Simi bar Chiya was a Jewish rabbi mentioned in the text of the Talmud.  He was a contemporary of Rav.

References

Talmud rabbis